Pavel Nový (born 5 September 1948) is a Czech actor. He has appeared in more than one hundred films since 1962.

Selected filmography

References

External links
 

1948 births
Living people
Actors from Plzeň
Czech male film actors
20th-century Czech male actors
21st-century Czech male actors
Czech Lion Awards winners